Nymphaea mexicana is a species of aquatic plant that is native to the Southern United States and Mexico as far south as Michoacán. Common names include yellow waterlily, Mexican waterlily and banana waterlily.

Nymphaea mexicana is perhaps best known as a noxious weed in wetlands outside of its native range, such as California. It can easily invade similar aquatic ecosystems when it is introduced. The plant is attractive and has been introduced to new habitats for ornamental purposes.

Nymphaea mexicana has thick rhizomes and long, spongy creeping stolons which bear bunches of small yellow roots that resemble miniature bananas. The plant can grow from seedlings or send out new shoots from its stolons. The large, flat leaves are green with purple or brown patterning, and float on the surface of the water. The floating lotus flowers have yellow petals and pointed, star-like, greenish-yellow sepals. The flowers close at night.

The plant flowers during the summer, and also during spring and fall in warmer areas. Seeds are contained in green berries which grow underwater. It grows in marshes and readily invades canals and other shallow waterways, sometimes becoming a nuisance.

The Canvasback duck, Aythya valisineria, feeds on the banana-like roots of the plant.

References

External links

USDA Plants Profile

Lady Bird Johnson Wildflower Center
California Department of Food and Agriculture

mexicana
Plants described in 1832
Freshwater plants
Flora of the Southern United States
Flora of the Southwestern United States
Flora of Mexico